Ludwik Skumin Tyszkiewicz (1748 – 26 June 1808) was a Polish–Lithuanian nobleman (szlachcic) and Field Lithuanian Hetman from 1780 to 1791, Great Lithuanian Treasurer from 1791, Great Lithuanian Marshal from 1793. Member of the Targowica Confederation.

In 1764, as an envoy from the Trakai Voivodeship he was an elector for Stanisław August Poniatowski, whose niece Konstancja Poniatowska, the daughter of Prince Kazimierz Poniatowski, he married in Warsaw on 4 April 1775. Their daughter Anna married Count Aleksander Stanisław Potocki.

In 1776,  Tyszkiewicz was an envoy to the Sejm from the Vilnius Voivodeship. and in 1778 was made the Marshal of the Sejm. In 1782, he was a supporter of the Permanent Council. During the Polish–Russian War of 1792, on a meeting of 23 July, he supported the accession of the king to the Targowica Confederation, whose example Tyszkiewicz himself soon followed, becoming Grand Marshal of Lithuania. During the Grodno Sejm, he was chosen as a negotiator with the Russian ambassador Jacob Sievers, and so on 22 July 1793 he signed the treaty of the cession of land to Russia, and then on 25 September to Prussia, as part of the Second Partition of Poland. In 1795, he was the leader of the Lithuanian party paying homage to Catherine II.

On 25 November 1776, he received the Order of the White Eagle and in 1778 the Order of St. Stanislaus. Later in 1787 he also received the Russian Orders of St. Alexander Nevsky and of St. Andrew. In 1792, he had built the Tyszkiewicz Palace in Warsaw.

See also 
Skumin

References

1748 births
1808 deaths
Politicians from Vilnius
People from Vilnius Voivodeship
Ludwig Skumin
Secular senators of the Polish–Lithuanian Commonwealth
Field Hetmans of the Grand Duchy of Lithuania
Grand Marshals of the Grand Duchy of Lithuania
Grand Treasurers of the Grand Duchy of Lithuania
Targowica confederates
Recipients of the Order of the White Eagle (Poland)